The Besbre is a river in central France, a left tributary of the Loire. Its source is on the mountain of Puy de Montoncel, northeast of Thiers, in the Massif Central. The Besbre flows generally north, through the following departments and towns:

 Allier: Laprugne, Lapalisse, Dompierre-sur-Besbre
 Loire:  Saint-Priest-la-Prugne

References

Rivers of France
Rivers of Auvergne-Rhône-Alpes
Rivers of Allier
Rivers of Loire (department)